Sione Piukala (born 8 June 1985) is a rugby union centre who plays for Perpignan and Tonga.

Piukala made his debut for Tonga in 2008 and was part of the Tonga squad at the 2015 Rugby World Cup.

References

External links

Living people
Tongan rugby union players
1985 births
Tonga international rugby union players
Rugby union centres